Morrinhos is a municipality in southern Goiás state, Brazil.  It is a large producer of agricultural products, especially poultry and dairy products.

Location

Neighboring municipalities are:
North: Piracanjuba
South: Buriti Alegre and Goiatuba
East: Caldas Novas, Rio Quente, and Água Limpa
West: Joviânia, Aloândia, and Pontalina

Political information
Mayor: Rogério Carlos Troncoso Chaves (January 2013)
City council: 9

Districts
Village (Povoado): Rancho Alegre
Hamlets (Aglomerados): Jardim da Luz, Marcelândia and Vertente Rica.

Demographic information
In 2007 the population density was  inhabitants/km2 ( inhabitants/sq mi). The population has grown at a moderate pace since 1980, when it was 32,122. The geometric growth rate between 2000 and 2007 was 0.76%. In 2003 most of the population was living in the urban area, which had 33,251 inhabitants, while 5,746 people were living in the rural area.

Climate and geography
The topography is flat and the relief is wavy. The flora is composed mainly of small woods with aroeira, cedar, jacaranda, ipê, and some medicinal plants like  douradinha, quinine, chapéu-de-couro, and congonha.

Economy

The economy is based on agriculture, services, and small industries.
Agriculture is the main economic activity and the main crops are soybeans, corn, rice, beans, tomatoes, cotton, pineapples, and citrus fruits.  The cattle herd is large, with 258,170 head in 2006.  With 66,690 dairy cattle, milk production is very important and Morrinhos was the third largest producer of milk in Goiás with over 67 million liters annual production in 2006.

There was a substantial poultry industry with 347,000 head in 2006.

In June 2007 there was 1 industrial zone in the city, 74 industrial units, and 494 retail units.  There were 2 dairies: Marajoara Indústria de Laticínios Ltda.; - Cooperativa Mista dos Produtos de Leite de Morrinhos Ltda (3 units).  The financial sector was represented by 5 branches: Banco do Brasil S.A. - BRADESCO S.A. - Banco Itaú S.A. - Banco ABN AMRO Real S.A - CEF.

Main agricultural products in total planted area were oranges, cotton, rice, beans, watermelon, corn, soybeans, sorghum, tomatoes, and wheat. (Data are from 2006 IBGE/Sepin.)

Farm data (2006)
Number of farms: 1,638
Total area: 
Area of permanent crops: 
Area of perennial crops: 
Area of natural pasture: 
Persons dependent on farming: 4,600
Farms with tractors: 355 (per IBGE)
Cotton: 
Corn: 
Beans: 
Rice: 
Soybeans: 
Oranges: 
Papaya: 
Guava: 
Passion fruit: 
Watermelon: 
Heart of palm: 
Sorghum: 
Tomatoes:  (With 114 central pivots, Morrinhos is the largest producer of tomatoes in the state.)

Health and education

In 2007 there were 3 hospitals with 121 beds.  One hospital was public and 2 were private.  The infant mortality rate was 13.88 in 2000, well below the state and national average.  In 2006 the school system had 40 schools and 10,458 students.  Higher education was represented by a campus of the state university: UEG - Faculdade de Educação, Ciências e Letras de Morrinhos - FECLEM.  The adult literacy rate was 88.9% in 2000.

Origin of the name
The name of the town comes from the hills (morros) of Ovo, Catraca, and Cruz, well-known points in the region.

High quality of life
Morrinhos is one of the best places to live in the state. In the United Nations Human Development Index, it had a rating of 0.806, which ranked it in 6th place out of a total of 242 municipalities in the state of Goiás. Nationally it was ranked 806 out of 5,503 municipalities. For the complete list see Frigoletto.com.br.

Tourism
The Jatobá Centenário ecological park was established in 1996. Various species of fauna can be found. The most common are the macacos-pregos (nail monkeys), tatus (armadillos), tamanduás, capivaras, wolves, foxes, deer, fish, jabutis, ducks, egrets, hawks, toucans, jaós, partridge, bem-te-vi, and joão-de-barro, among others.

The  Jatobá centenário (centenary) is the largest tree in the park, which impresses visitors with its majestic beauty. There are several natural lakes in the forest with cold and clear waters.

History

In the beginning of the nineteenth century, Antônio Correia Bueno and his brothers Inácio and Pedro, from Patrocínio, Minas Gerais, arrived in the region. Only Antônio decided to stay with his family. In 1845, Captain Gaspar Martins Veiga donated the land to create the town. Its first name was Nossa Senhora do Carmo but when it was elevated to a district the name was changed to Vila Bela de Morrinhos (or in some documents Vila Bela do Paranaíba). In 1855, it became a municipality, including the district of Vila Bela do Paranaíba (seat) and Santa Rita do Paranaíba.

 1855: The loss of Caldas Novas and suppression of the municipality of Vila Bela do Paranaíba, whose territory now became part of Santa Cruz.
 1869: The municipality of Nossa Senhora da Abadia de Pouso Alto (Piracanjuba) is created, with territory dismembered from the municipalities of Santa Cruz and Bonfim and the Districts of Pouso Alto (seat), Vila Bela do Paranaíba, Caldas Novas and Santa Rita do Paranaíba.
 1871: Re-establishment of the municipality with the name of Vila Bela de Morrinhos or, according to other documents, Vila Bela de Nossa Senhora do Carmo de Morrinhos, with territory dismembered from the municipality of Pouso Alto (Piracanjuba).
 1882: Concession of status as a city, which began to be designated Morrinhos.
 1892: The municipality of Morrinhos is made up of the districts of Morrinhos, Santa Rita do Paranaíba, Caldas Novas and Bandeiras (later, Goiatuba).
 1909: The municipality of Santa Rita do Paranaíba is created, taking the district of Bananeiras.
 1911: The municipality of Caldas Novas is created, with territory dismembered from Morrinhos, including the village of Marzagão.
 1919: The district of Bananeiras (present-day Goiatuba) is returned to the municipality of Morrinhos.
 1920: The municipality of Morrinhos includes the districts of  Morrinhos, Bananeiras and Santa Rita do Pontal (present day {Pontalina). According to the census of 1920, Morrinhos is the municipality in Goiás with the greatest number of rural properties (1,172).
 1931: The village of Bananeiras is elevated to the condition of Vila and the municipality of Bananeiras is created. Today it is called Goiatuba.
 1935:  The district of Santa Rita do Pontal separates to become the municipality of Pontalina. Source History of Morrinhos.

See also
List of municipalities in Goiás

References

Frigoletto
 Sepin

External links
Canal Morrinhos
Governo da cidade de Morrinhos - A Serviço de Você!

Municipalities in Goiás